Black Velvet is an album by American jazz guitarist O'Donel Levy recorded in 1971 and released on the Groove Merchant label.

Reception 

Allmusic's Jason Ankeny said: "Black Velvet boasts a smooth, rich texture absent from O'Donel Levy's subsequent Groove Merchant sessions – its mellow, stoned-soul sensibilities nevertheless complement the guitarist perfectly, affording him the space to weave a series of righteously beautiful solos ...the arrangements are lovely ... Levy also proves himself a composer of some distinction, contributing a pair of charming originals".

Track listing
All compositions by O'Donel Levy except where noted
 "Watch What Happens" (Michel Legrand, Jacques Demy, Norman Gimbel) – 3:33
 "Granny" – 4:24
 "I'll Close My Eyes" (Billy Reid) – 5:05
 "Nature's Child" – 3:48
 "Love Story" (Francis Lai, Carl Sigman) – 2:09
 "Didn't I (Blow Your Mind This Time)" (Thom Bell, William Hart) – 3:06
 "I'll Be There" (Berry Gordy, Bob West, Willie Hutch, Hal Davis) – 4:12
 "Misty" (Erroll Garner) – 4:26
 "Call Me" (Tony Hatch) – 4:03
 "You've Made Me So Very Happy" (Brenda Holloway, Patrice Holloway, Frank Wilson, Berry Gordy) – 4:24

Personnel
O'Donel Levy – guitar
 Billy Skinner – trumpet
Arthur 'Fats' Theus – tenor saxophone, flute
Charles Covington – electric piano, organ
Alarza Lee Collins – bass
Chester Thompson – drums
Nathaniel Rice Jr. − congas
William Thorpe – percussion

References

Groove Merchant albums
O'Donel Levy albums
1971 albums
Albums produced by Sonny Lester